The Small West Siberian Railway or Novosibirsk Children's Railway (Russian: Малая Западно-Сибирская железная дорога, Malaya Zapadno-Sibirskaya zheleznaya doroga) is a narrow gauge miniature railway in the Russian city Novosibirsk. The first section of the railway line was opened on 4 June 2005 as one of the many children's railways in Russia. It is still in use every day in summer except Mondays.

Route 
It has five stations.

History 
The decision to build a children's railway in Novosibirsk, was announced in August 2003 by the West Siberian Railway together with the city council of Novosibirsk, when the foundation stone was laid in Zayeltsovsky Park, although the planning had not yet been fully completed. The design of the track was contracted to the institutions Sibgiprotrans and Zheldorproekt.

It was formally taken in use on 30 June 2005 by the Director of the West Siberian Railway as the 23rd children's railway of Russia.

In summer 2005 only one train operated. The train had one locomotive at each end, and could change direction without de-coupling the locomotives. On 14 November 2005 the President of the Russian Railways Vladimir Yakunin visited the railway.

In 2015 the railway announced at its 10th anniversary that it had transported more than 480,000 passengers.

Rolling stock

Locomotives 
The children's railway operates three TU7A diesel locomotives with a power of 294 kW (400 hp) each and a weight of 24 t as well as a newer TU10 diesel locomotive with a power of 170 kW (230 hp). Their serial numbers are as follows:

 TU7A diesel locomotive – № 3338, № 3339 and № 3343
 TU10 diesel locomotive – № TU10-006

Carriages 
There are also six passenger carriages of Type 20,0011 and 048-051 „Metrovagonmash“ and three of Type 43-0011 Kambarka an eight-wheeler flat waggon for track maintenance -.in use. Each train has three passenger carriages.

The trains have the names „Skazka“ (Сказка, Fairy tale), „Yunost“ (Юность, Youth), „Sibiryak“ (Сибиряк, Sibirian) and „Mechta“ (Мечта, Dream).

Operation 
The trains run daily with the exception of Mondays during the season from 1 June to 30 September.

References

Children's railways
Rail transport in Siberia
750 mm gauge railways in Russia
Zayeltsovsky City District, Novosibirsk
2005 establishments in Russia